The Associação Atética XI de Agosto (Athletic Association XI of August), is a Brazilian amateur football club of Tatuí city. It is one of the oldest clubs in the city, and it was officially founded on August 11, 1929, even though it had existed since May 14, 1916.

History

The team was born from an impromptu match among young residents of the city who decided to form two teams for a game which ended with a score of 1 to 0 and resulted in the teams merging to become the Associação Atlética XI de Agosto. The name was a tribute to the anniversary of the city.
 
It is the only club in town to compete for the Paulista Championship between the decades of 50 and 70.

Club

Although football is the main sport practiced by Associação Atlética XI de Agosto, in recent years it has been participating in other sports such as basketball and futsal, staff ace Falcão, and his team have always competed in junior regional championships, and state championship.

Ground

The Stadium DR. Gualter Nunes began as a floodplain. In June 1930 the field was closed with boards in order for a grandstand to be built. The first game was on August 11 that year against Pindorama Athletic Association, but its official inauguration took place exactly 5 years later, on 11, August 1935 against Palestra Itália which resulted in a 1 to 1 tie.

Titles

 Tricampeão of LITAFU Amateur in 1940, 1941 and 1942;
 Bicampeão Amateur Championship of the State of São Paulo in 1957 and 1958;
 Champion's Cup Football Hall Varzeano in 2003;
 Champion Football Sub-18 of Tatuí in 2006;
 Winner of the Under-21 Football Tatuí in 2006;
 Winner of the category of superveteraníssima News Radio Cup Football Master 2008;

References

Football clubs in Tatuí
Association football clubs established in 1929
1929 establishments in Brazil